The Greany Building is a historic mixed-use commercial and residential building located at 1270–1288 Pleasant Street in Fall River, Massachusetts.

Description and history 
It is a large four-story brick building designed in a vernacular late Victorian commercial style. The building was constructed in 1891 for Thomas Greany, who operated a dry goods retail operation in part of the first floor, while the upstairs housed 15 residential units. In 1896, Rinfret Bros., a clothier, occupied part of the premises. The building is one of Fall River's finest surviving 19th-century commercial buildings.

The building was listed on the National Register of Historic Places on February 16, 1983.

See also
National Register of Historic Places listings in Fall River, Massachusetts

References

Commercial buildings on the National Register of Historic Places in Massachusetts
Buildings and structures in Fall River, Massachusetts
National Register of Historic Places in Fall River, Massachusetts

Buildings and structures completed in 1891
Victorian architecture in Massachusetts